Estádio Joaquim Américo Guimarães, known commonly as Arena da Baixada, is a stadium located in Curitiba, the state capital of Paraná, Brazil. It is the home stadium of Club Athletico Paranaense, and has a capacity of 42,372 people. The stadium was the first in Brazil to sell its naming rights; it was known as Kyocera Arena between 2005 and 1 April 2008. It was the first retractable roof stadium built in South America.

With Curitiba selected as one of the host cities of the 2014 FIFA World Cup, the stadium was rebuilt between 2012 and 2014. Its capacity was expanded to 42,372 seats.

Located in the Água Verde borough near the center of Curitiba, the history of the stadium began in the early twentieth century, when in 1914, Joaquim Américo Guimarães (1879–1917), then president of the International (the forefathers of Club Athletico Paranaense), led the construction of the then Arena da Baixada stadium. Athletico came into existence ten years later, inheriting the assets, including the stadium.

History
The stadium was built at the previous location of a Brazilian Army powder depot. In 1934, the stadium was renamed Estádio Joaquim Américo Guimarães. In 1980, the stadium received its first floodlights. From 1986 to 1994, the stadium was closed and Athletico Paranaense played their games at Estadio Pinheirão. After being reopened in 1994 and operating for some years, the old stadium building was demolished on March 26, 1997, right after a construction project of a new arena was announced. In June 1999, the new stadium was built. In 2005, the stadium was renamed Kyocera Arena, after the Japanese company Kyocera purchased the naming rights. The contract with Kyocera ended in early 2008. It was not renewed, and no new partnership was announced. As a result, the stadium went back to its old name, Arena da Baixada.

The inaugural match of the old stadium was played on 6 September 1914, when Flamengo beat Internacional 7–1. The first goal of the stadium was scored by Flamengo's Arnaldo.

The inaugural match of the new stadium was played on 24 June 1999, when Athletico Paranaense beat Cerro Porteño of Paraguay 2–1. The first goal of the stadium after its reinauguration was scored by Athletico's Lucas Severino.

The stadium's football attendance record currently stands at 40,263, set on 12 December 2018 when Athletico Paranaense defeated Atletico Junior on penalties for the 2018 Copa Sudamericana Final.

The attendance record for a non-football event was registered on July 27, 2019, when "Semana de Avivamento" took place (a religious event among evangelical churches). On this day, 45,925 people attended the event.

2014 FIFA World Cup

Ever since renovation works were completed in June 1999, the historic Estádio Joaquim Américo has been considered by many experts and journalists as one of Brazil's most modern and best-appointed stadiums.

The stadium, which was originally constructed back in 1914, was one of the venues chosen to host games at the 2014 FIFA World Cup.

Prior to welcoming the global showpiece, the stadium underwent another set of renovation works from 2012 to 2014. The renovations were a series of improvements in facilities and the addition of rows of extra seats parallel to the pitch. This resulted in an increased capacity of 42,000, which made it possible for the stadium to host four World Cup matches.

Construction of the stadium did not come without difficulties. Building work at the stadium was suspended in October 2013 on the orders of a Brazilian labor tribunal due to numerous and serious safety breaches. “Countless infractions have been committed, in various stages of the building project,” wrote the judge Lorena Colnago in her decision, the Paraná Regional Labor Tribunal said in a statement. Subsequently, the planned retractable roof for the stadium was canceled because it would not be ready in time for the world cup. In late 2014, construction of the planned retractable roof resumed. With the completion of the project in March 2015, Arena da Baixada became the first stadium in South America with a retractable roof.

The official inauguration of the renovated stadium was on May 14, 2014, in a friendly match between Athletico and Corinthians Paulista that finished 2–1 to Corinthians in front of 30,000 people. The first goal was scored by Athletico's Marcelo Cirino in the 13th minute.

The first match to be held during the world cup was played between Iran and Nigeria, on June 16, ending with no goals.

Matches

UFC 198: Werdum vs. Miocic

The event was the first that the promotion hosted in Curitiba. It was the fourth stadium venue and first Brazilian stadium to host a UFC event and drew 45,207 fans, then the third largest crowd in UFC's history. Two Curitiba natives, Cris Cyborg and Shogun Rua, appeared on the official card with both winning their fights.

2017 FIVB Volleyball World League
In 2017, the stadium hosted the final round of 2017 FIVB Volleyball World League.

Pool J1

|}

Pool K1

|}

Semifinals

|}

3rd place match

|}

Final

|}

Further reading 
Enciclopédia do Futebol Brasileiro, Volume 2 - Lance, Rio de Janeiro: Aretê Editorial S/A, 2001.

References

External links

Arena da Baixada -at Athletico Paranaense official website
CAP S/A – by CAP S/A website
Baixada - by Furacao.com website
 - CAP International Relations

Arena Da Baixada
Arena Da Baixada
Football venues in Paraná (state)
2014 FIFA World Cup stadiums
Sports venues in Paraná (state)
Sports venues completed in 1999
Covered stadiums
Retractable-roof stadiums
1999 establishments in Brazil